Wu Rong-i (born 15 December 1939) is a Taiwanese politician. Wu was the Vice Premier in 2005–2006., and now serves as senior advisor to Tsai Ing-wen, current President of Taiwan, and as Chairman of Taiwania Capital Management Corporation, the investment arm of Taiwan.

Education
In 1962 and 1965, Wu received his B.A. and M.A. in Economics from the National Taiwan University. Afterward, he obtained his doctoral degree in economics from Catholic University of Leuven in Belgium.

Work
From 1992 to 1993, Wu served as Commissioner and Member of the Fair Trade Commission (Taiwan). He became Director and President of the Taiwan Institute of Economic Research from 1993 until 2005, and from 2005 onwards he was Vice Premier of the Executive Yuan of Taiwan. From 2001 to 2005, Wu was President and Chairman of Taiwan Stock Exchange. He has also served as Chairman of Taiwan Brain Trust and Taiwan Futures Exchange, and as Advisor to the Taiwan delegation to the APEC Ministerial and Leaders' Meetings.

Cross-strait relations
In October 2005, Wu said that Chinese unification is highly unlikely to happen during his lifetime unless Beijing uses force. However, he considers Mainland China as a big brother, and wish to take the opportunity for Taiwanese to invest in the mainland and have peaceful relation with them.

In early October 2013 during the cross-strait peace forum in Shanghai in which attended by officials from the Communist Party of China, Pan-Blue Coalition and Pan-Green Coalition, Wu proposed the idea that Taiwan and Mainland China represent an "allegiance of brotherhood".

See also
 List of vice premiers of the Republic of China
 Notable Alumni of Catholic University of Leuven

References

Living people
1939 births
Political office-holders in the Republic of China on Taiwan
Catholic University of Leuven (1834–1968) alumni
Politicians of the Republic of China on Taiwan from Kaohsiung
National Taiwan University alumni
Fulbright alumni